This article discusses aircraft carrier operations during World War II.

Historical overview
Naval historians such as Evan Mawdsley, Richard Overy, and Craig Symonds  concluded that World War II's decisive victories on land could not have been won without decisive victories at sea. Naval battles to keep shipping lanes open for combatant's movement of troops, guns, ammunition, tanks, warships, aircraft, raw materials, and food largely determined the outcome of land battles. Without the Allied victory in keeping shipping lanes open during the Battle of the Atlantic, Britain could not have fed her people or withstood Axis offensives in Europe and North Africa. Without Britain's survival and without Allied shipments of food and industrial equipment to the Soviet Union, her military and economic power would likely not have rebounded in time for Russian soldiers to prevail at Stalingrad and Kursk.

Without victories at sea in the Pacific theater, the Allies could not have mounted amphibious assaults on or maintained land forces on Guadalcanal, New Guinea, Saipan, The Philippines, Iwo Jima, or Okinawa. Allied operations in the Atlantic and Pacific theaters were interconnected because they frequently competed for scarce naval resources for everything from aircraft carriers to transports and landing craft. Effective transport of troops and military supplies between the two war theaters required naval protection for shipping routes around the Cape of Good Hope, through the Suez canal, and through the Panama Canal. In both theaters, maritime dominance enabled combatants to use the sea for their own purposes and deprive its use by adversaries. As naval historian Admiral Herbert Richmond stated, "Sea power did not win the war itself: it enabled the war to be won."

Aircraft carriers played a major role in winning decisive naval battles, supporting key amphibious landings, and keeping critical merchant shipping lanes open for transporting military personnel and their equipment to land battle zones.

Ascendancy of aircraft carriers over battleships
It became apparent early in the war that control of the air was prerequisite for successful surface action both on land and at sea. For much of the war, Britain and America fought mainly on the seas,  where successful Allied naval operations permitted effective support and reinforcement of troops in North Africa, the Soviet Union, western Europe and the Pacific. These operations also crippled similar efforts by Italy and Japan to sustain the empires they built by conquest. By 1942, aircraft carriers with the striking power provided by hundreds of warplanes delivering bombs and torpedoes to targets hundreds of miles away supplanted battleships with big guns as the principal warships around which navies assembled task forces for major campaigns.

Only the United States, United Kingdom, and Japan made significant use of aircraft carriers during the war. The following table shows the number of each type of carrier the principal combatants operated that had at least one flight deck,  was capable of both launching and recovering aircraft at sea, and that was operational sometime between July 1937 and August 1945. The counts include carriers in service before the war began as well as those commissioned during the war.

World War II fleet carriers typically displaced 20,000 to 35,000 tons and could sail at 30 to 35 knots. Japanese and American fleet carriers were typically capable of carrying 50 to 90 aircraft into combat. British carriers were designed with armored decks, a measure that provided significantly greater protection against bombs and kamikazes. The additional weight of the armor, however, reduced their typical carrying capability to 35 to 55 aircraft. Thus their additional defensive measures limited their offensive striking power until Britain introduced a new carrier class late in the war.

Light aircraft carriers were fast enough to keep up with the fleet carriers but their smaller size typically reduced their aircraft load to between 30 and 50. The design of those commissioned immediately after the war began typically reflected the immediate need for fast carriers and took advantage either of having other ship hulls available for conversion to aircraft carriers or the available capacity of commercial shipyards to build them.  While these carriers made contributions to the war efforts, their relatively small size made them operationally inefficient.  The measure of naval power in the Pacific Theater was the number of fleet carriers a navy had.

Escort carriers were smaller, slower, lightly armored, and carried 20 to 30 aircraft. They were not typically included with naval battle fleets, but before the war was over, escort carriers had performed every function that the larger carriers did.

Merchant aircraft carriers (MACs) transported grain and oil in the holds below the flight deck and carried 3 or 4 aircraft to protect themselves and other ships in convoys in which they traveled. None were used for offensive operations.

Land-based aircraft as well as carrier-launched aircraft fought at sea. In the Atlantic Theater, German and Italian aircraft attacked Allied convoys that were protected by fighter aircraft from Allied airfields as long as convoys were within fighter range. As carriers became available, Allied carrier-launched fighters provided protection in those ocean areas that could not be protected by land-based planes. In the Pacific Theater, Japan's successful expansion was typically achieved by progressively using land-based aircraft to support invasions of new areas that were within striking distance of airbases that they had established on previously conquered areas. For the Allies, land-based aircraft at local airfields contributed significantly to America's defense of Midway Island and Guadalcanal. Naval fighters and bombers that operated from land-based airfields were typically delivered to battle zones by aircraft carriers. In both theaters, carrier-launched aircraft played significant roles in dominating the air, and construction of aircraft carriers received priority.

At the same time that America, Britain, and Japan began emphasizing aircraft carrier construction, they de-emphasized construction of battleships. Before the war, the number of battleships a country operated was universally regarded as the principal indicator of naval power. The Japanese attack on Pearl Harbor sank or damaged eight of America's eighteen battleships. The aircraft carriers were at sea and escaped destruction. Six of the eight were repaired and returned to service and eight new battleships were commissioned during the rest of the war. During the period September 1939 to August 1945, America commissioned ten new battleships while Japan commissioned only two and converted two existing ones to hybrid aircraft carriers. Starting the war with 15 battleships and battlecruisers, the UK commissioned five King George V class battleships but the need for smaller vessels precluded building any more Germany, Italy, and France together commissioned a total of six. All together, only 23 new battleships were added to combatants' fleets during the war years compared to 55 new fleet and light carriers.

During the entire war, battleship guns sank only a single fleet carrier and a single battleship. In comparison, carrier-launched aircraft damaged, sank, or took part in sinking 19 battleships. Although Japan was first to recognize and exploit the greater effective striking power of aircraft carriers over battleships, she was slow to abandon employment of the latter. She commissioned battleships in 1941 and 1942 that were the largest and most heavily armed ever built. After the losses at the Battle of Midway, however, Japan changed naval tactics and began leaving battleships out of major naval engagements. America began primary reliance upon its aircraft carriers for offensive operations early in the Pacific war out of necessity after the destruction of its Pacific battleship fleet during the Japanese raid on Pearl Harbor.

Functions performed by aircraft carriers

Aircraft carriers were used for a wide variety of combat and combat support functions during the war. These included:

 Naval battles, during which carrier aircraft attacked each other and enemy warships, as they did during the Battle of Midway between American and Japanese fleets.
 Invasions, during which carrier aircraft provided support for amphibious landings and for occupying enemy-held positions by bombing those positions before, during, and after landings; spotting for warship guns, sometimes even controlling the firing; delivering replacement aircraft and aircrews to other carriers and to airfields after successful landings, as during the American invasion of Iwo Jima.
 Raids, during which carrier aircraft attacked enemy positions to degrade them but without the intention of landing and occupying those positions, as during the Japanese Attack on Pearl Harbor and raid on Ceylon.
 Anti-shipping missions, during which carrier aircraft blockaded enemy ports or attacked enemy shipping and shipping facilities, as during the Allied attacks around Bodø, Norway.
 Anti-raider missions, in which carrier aircraft searched for and attacked enemy surface ships engaged in raiding enemy merchant shipping, as during the British sinking of the Bismark.
 Anti-submarine missions, during which Hunter-killer Groups operating independently from convoys and their Escort Groups searched for and destroyed enemy submarines, during the Battle of the Atlantic.
 Convoy Escort, carrier aircraft searched for and attacked enemy aircraft and submarines that threatened a convoy's merchant ships.
 Training, during which carriers were dedicated to training pilots and/or conducting operating trials to improve carrier tactics and procedures.
 Repatriation, during which carriers, after the war, participated in returning military personnel to their home countries, as was done under America's Operation Magic Carpet.

The combatants differed in the functions they emphasized for carrier use, in part as a result of the challenges presented by their principal theater of operations. The table below indicates the percentage of carriers each combatant used for each function. For example, the US Navy operated a total of 33 fleet and light carriers during the war. Seventy-three percent of these carriers participated in naval battles at one time or another. Eighty-five percent were involved in support of invasions, etc. Escort carriers, although initially envisioned by many to perform only in support roles, ultimately performed all of the functions that the fleet and light carriers did.

Aircraft carrier contribution to Allied victory

Historian Craig Symonds lists three key factors enabling the Allies to win the war: British "grit", Russian manpower, and American industrial strength. Specifically, the British Empire and Dominions continued for a year after the fall of France, stubbornly and successfully resisting the Axis. Thirty-five million Soviet Union soldiers fought during the war, as many as the United States, Germany, and Japan combined. The Soviet Union lost an estimated ten million soldiers to combat deaths, many more than any other combatant. America produced more artillery pieces, tanks, ships, and aircraft than all Axis countries combined, including over 70% of the aircraft carriers commissioned during the war.

Historian Richard Overy points out that statistics demonstrating material superiority are not by themselves sufficient for explaining why the Allies won the war. Less easily quantifiable factors also played a significant part. The political will to fight and willingness of individual combatants to sacrifice was present within both the Allies and Axis. However, the timing of mobilizing manufacturing, technological, and manpower responses was also very important. America and Russia mobilized men and industrial capacity to rebound from significant military setbacks more quickly than anticipated by the attacking Axis powers. Important technological advances achieved by the Allies during the war outpaced those of the Axis powers in both offensive and defensive weapons systems. The Allies had greater and more strategically significant successes with code-breaking. The Allies placed greater emphasis than Axis powers on logistical support for men fighting on the front, enabling them to fight more efficiently and effectively. Geographical configurations, namely the English Channel, Atlantic Ocean, and Pacific Ocean, helped isolate British and American home bases from attack. Significant strategic offensive decisions by Axis leaders proved unsound, creating opportunities that the Allies exploited to great effect. Finally, luck played an important part in some decisive battles. Many of these factors played important parts in enabling the Allies to dominate the seas, a central reason, according to historian Evan Mawdsley, for their emerging victorious in the war. Nonetheless, while statistics relating to industrial capacity to produce arms and planes and ships do not tell the whole story, they remain an important part of it.

Successful Allied initiatives at El Alamein, Stalingrad, French North Africa, and Guadalcanal in November 1942 marked strategic shifts for World War II. Aircraft carriers contributed to the success of these operations by protecting convoys of armaments and other supplies to Egypt and Russia, keeping Malta supplied and able to disrupt Axis supply operations to North Africa, providing air support for troops during the invasion of North Africa, and by helping prevent Japanese troops and supplies from reaching Guadalcanal. Beginning in 1943, the extensive mobilization of American production capability for war resulted in dramatic increases in the number of carriers available for even more strategic initiatives. Overall, aircraft carriers contributed greatly to making 1942 the pivotal, turning point of the war, 1944 the decisive year, and 1945 one for essentially finishing up, albeit at great cost.

In the Atlantic Theater, successful transportation of troops, aircraft, tanks, oil, and food from or routed through North America or up the West African coast to Britain, Russia, North Africa, and continental Europe was essential for ultimate Allied victory. Allied aircraft carriers screened by corvettes, destroyers and destroyer escorts proved more successful and cost-effective than battleships or cruisers for protecting convoys from attacks by Axis submarines, raiders, and land-based aircraft. By mid-1943, the Axis threat of cutting essential Allied supply lines had passed. By this time, however, six British carriers had been sunk.

In the Pacific Theater, a force of six Japanese fleet carriers with their combined aircraft striking power, the Kidō Butai, acted as a unit and roamed virtually at will for the first six months of the war. It made destructive raids against enemy positions from Hawaii in the east to India in the west and effectively supported Japanese invasions of the American Philippines, British Malaya and Burma, and the Dutch East Indies. Between May and October 1942, however, Japan and America fought four major battles between fleets centered around their aircraft carriers. During these battles, opposing warships never came within sight of each other nor fired their guns at other warships. Aircraft alone did the attacking. The first of these battles thwarted the Japanese attempt in the Coral Sea to isolate Australia. The second halted the expansion of Japanese control eastward in the Pacific toward Midway Island. The next two helped sustain the American presence on Guadalcanal. These four engagements were costly for both sides. At the time Pearl Harbor was attacked, Japan had a total of nine fleet and light carriers in the Pacific Theater. America had four in the Pacific with another two far away in the Atlantic. At the end of October 1942, after battle attrition from sinkings and damages, Japan had only three such carriers operational in the Pacific Theater and America, for a two-week period, had none. Though costly, the battles were strategically advantageous for the Americans, contributing significantly to the shift of strategic initiative in the Pacific Theater from Japan to America.

America was better able make good on their losses from these battles. From October 1942 until the end of the Pacific war, America commissioned 26 new fleet and light carriers. Japan commissioned eight. Over the entire war, the Allies commissioned a total of 181 carriers of all types compared to Japan's total of 19.

Number of operational aircraft carriers

The number of aircraft carriers operational for combat missions at any time was typically less than the total number of carriers afloat. For example, at the end of October 1942 following the Battle of the Santa Cruz Islands, only seven (47%) of the fifteen fleet and light carriers the combatants had afloat worldwide were operational. Japan had six such carriers afloat but only three were operational. America had three afloat, but one was in the Atlantic and the other two were damaged, leaving no operational carriers in the Pacific. Britain had six afloat, all in the Atlantic, but only three were operational. In the Pacific for a short period, there were no Allied carriers that could oppose Japan's three operational carriers.

As the war progressed, the relative number of operational carriers available for combat by each side depended upon 1)construction rates for new carriers, 2)losses due to sinkings, 3)how quickly carriers damaged in combat could be brought back into service, and 4)the time required for routine overhauls, refits for carriers to perform specific functions, and upgrades for older carriers. Short-term naval capabilities, plans, and outcomes were determined by the number of carriers that were operational during any given month. The impact of the relative number of operational, combat-ready carriers available was particularly felt during 1942, when the strategic initiative in the Pacific Theater passed from Japan to America.

Carrier construction and commissioning

Prior to 1936, international naval arms limitation treaties negotiated in Washington in 1922 and London in 1930 had required that the total number of Japanese capital ships (battleships, battle cruisers, aircraft carriers) be less than the number operated by either America or Britain. The agreed upon ratio was 5:5:3 for Britain, America, and Japan respectively. Dissatisfied with these limitations, Japan discontinued participation in naval treaty negotiations in 1936 and invested in a construction program that within five years doubled the number of her fleet and light carriers. At the time of Japan's raid on Pearl Harbor and her invasion of British Malaya, Japan had almost as many such carriers afloat as Britain and America combined. Moreover, since the western Allies deployed half of their carriers in the Atlantic and Mediterranean) to oppose Germany and Italy, Japan had almost twice the Allies' number of carriers in the Pacific Theater (including the Indian Ocean) when she initiated hostilities.

Beginning in December 1942, the effects of America's industrial strength became evident as she began commissioning either a fleet carrier or a light carrier almost every month for the next two years. From November 1942, after the losses that year from four carrier battles, until the end of the war, America commissioned 26 new such carriers compared to 8 for Japan and 9 for Britain.

Sea trials, delivery time, refitting

The time from building to entering operational service included  sea trials to test the ship's systems and to train personnel. Only then did carriers move to intended war zones. Construction of  began in 1937 but she did not become combat operational until mid-1941 when rushed into the hunt for the German battleship Bismarck with only a quarter of her aircraft onboard . The   began in April 1941 and she was operational in mid-1943, in a raid on Rabaul eight months after commissioning.

The elapsed time between commissioning and combat action could also be short or long for escort carriers.  (CVE), a converted oil tanker rushed into service, still had workmen aboard during her shakedown cruise. Within seven weeks of commissioning, her aircraft were bombing airfields, spotting for warship's guns, patrolling for enemy cruisers and submarines, and refueling other ships in support of the invasion of North Africa. On the other hand,  (an escort carrier) built in the US, experienced one of the longest periods between commissioning and combat action. She was built at Seattle on the US  West Coast  and then transferred to a Royal Canadian Dockyard Vancounver where she was commissioned in August 1943. She remained there until February 1944 undergoing modifications to meet Britain's requirements for deployment to defend convoys. She then sailed via the Panama Canal to the Atlantic and participated in exercises with other escort carriers in the Caribbean before heading north to Norfolk. Aircraft were embarked for transport to Britain, where Empress arrived in April. There, through November, she underwent repairs for defects and modifications considered necessary based upon experience with other operational escort carriers. Further preparations took place in December. In January 1945, still without aircrew aboard, she sailed for the Indian Ocean, where she took on an air squadron and participated in reconnaissance flights in February about 18 months after initial commissioning.

Escort carriers constructed in American shipyards and transferred to Britain spent more time being delivered because of the distance from America's west coast and Britain. In addition, modifications made in some cases because of concerns over onboard safety increased the elapsed time between CVE's commissioning and becoming operational. In addition, some elapsed time was due to modifications to make some carriers suitable for specific combat functions. As lessons were learned during combat, carriers were refitted to change armament or otherwise reconfigure systems. Such modifications removed carriers from combat availability during these modifications.

Combat damage

Damage to carriers due to weapons systems, collisions, weather, and other causes also reduced the number of carriers available for operations at any given time. Not every incident resulted in significant loss of combat effectiveness or retirement from combat. However, there were at least 229 incidents for which damage was sustained by carriers from enemy weapon systems or causes such as extreme weather (storms, typhoons), collisions, aircraft landing accidents, etc. that resulted in lost operational time.  Forty-one of these damage incidents resulted in a carrier sinking.  Fourteen incidents of damage involved more than one cause such as a carrier being damaged by both bombs and aerial torpedoes during a single attack.  Taking such multiple causes for the 229  “damage incidents” into account, the number of “damage involvements” due to the various causes totaled 243.  Consequently, the total for percentages of damage involvements may equal more than 100% of damage incidents.  The percentages shown in the tables below indicate the frequency that a given cause was involved in the 229 incidents of damage/sinkings.

Enemy bombs were the leading cause of lost operational time for aircraft carriers during the war. They were involved in 25% of the 229 damage incidents.  In addition, bombs were involved in sinking 44% of carriers sunk.  The second largest cause for carriers’ lost operational time was attacks by Japan's Special Attack Units, i.e., suicide planes that became known as kamikazes.  Although introduced only in the last year of the war, kamikazes were involved in 19% of the total damage incidents.  They were less effective for inflicting sufficient damage to sink carriers, however, and were involved in only 7% of carrier sinkings.  Torpedoes launched by submarines and by aircraft were both involved in sinking more carriers than kamikazes, even during the final year of the war after kamikazes had been introduced. Torpedoes were also more efficient in sinking carriers as indicated by the higher percentage of damage involvements that resulted in sinking (59% when submarine-launched and 64% when aircraft-launched).  The percentage of damage involvements resulting in sinkings also indicates that surface weapons were more efficient in sinking carriers than aerial-delivered weapons even though aerial weapons resulted in more carriers sunk.  Causes other than weapon systems were responsible for 39% of lost time incidents, but accounted for only one carrier sank, an escort carrier.

Carrier losses

In the early years of the war, the combatants risked and lost a high percentage of their carriers. By October 1942, after the carrier battles for the year, America, Britain, and Japan had, in both theaters, lost a combined total of 15 fleet and light carriers. With new commissionings, they then had 15 such carriers afloat compared with the 18 they had in August 1939 at the opening of the European war and 24 in December 1941 when Pearl Harbor was attacked. The following table shows the number of such carriers sunk each year of the war. The total number of escort carriers (CVE) sunk during the war is also shown.

Percentage of time operational

Taking into account all the factors that kept aircraft carriers out of combat after commissioning, carriers were typically operational 80% to 90% of the time.  They were typically out of service 5% to 15% for combat-related damage repair and 5% to 10% for delivery and refitting to otherwise improve performance.  Royal Navy escort carriers were typically out of service for refitting more than other carriers.

Carriers operational at the end of each month

The number of operational carriers available to the combatants at any point in time affected the capability, plans, and outcomes of military operations in both the Atlantic and Pacific theaters throughout the war. Taking into consideration the time for construction, shakedown trials, delivery, refitting, combat damage, and sinkings, the table below shows the number of fleet and light carriers that were operational for each combatant in each combat theater at the end of each month. The Pacific Theater includes the Indian Ocean and the Atlantic Theater includes the Mediterranean Sea.

The table capsulizes the course of the war for aircraft carrier operations. It reflects how Japan more than doubled the number of her carriers between leaving the Washington/London naval treaties in 1936 and the time she attacked Pearl Harbor in December 1941. It also reflects the attrition for carriers during the formative year of 1942. It reflects the industrial capacity of the United States, illustrating how she could make good her losses of 1942 while Japan could not. Finally, it reflects the shift of British carriers to the Pacific after the Allies prevailed in battles for Atlantic waters. Note also that, after the two carrier battles off Guadalcanal in 1942, the percentage of aircraft carriers afloat that were in fact available for combat operations was typically less than 70%. During the Guadalcanal campaign in 1942, that percentage fell below 50%. From then until mid-1944, Japan did not engage her carriers in a major operation. When at last she did, the rest of her carriers were sunk or damaged.

Atlantic theater 
.  
The US defined the Atlantic theater as including the North Atlantic, South Atlantic, and Arctic Oceans along with the Mediterranean and Caribbean Seas and the Gulf of Mexico.

The UK defined the Mediterranean as a separate theatre together with North Africa and Middle East.

For convoy defence against enemy submarines, escort carriers came into service in numbers in 1942.

Pacific theater

The US Pacific theater included the Pacific and Indian oceans along with adjacent sea areas such as the South China Sea, East China Sea, and the Sea of Japan.

Carrier aircraft used during World War II

Lists of aircraft carriers operational
Lists of aircraft carriers by carrier type for each country may be found at Lists of aircraft carriers operational during World War II.

Aircraft carrier operations

Design and capability of aircraft carriers

See also

 Atlantic Theater aircraft carrier operations during World War II
 Pacific Theater aircraft carrier operations during World War II
 Carrier aircraft used during World War II
 Design and capability of aircraft carriers during World War II
 Lists of aircraft carriers operational during World War II
 Lists of aircraft carrier operations during World War II
Allied submarines in the Pacific War

Footnotes

Citations

Principal sources

Aircraft carriers
Naval battles and operations of World War II